Eero Väre (born 20 December 1984) is a Finnish professional ice hockey goaltender who played with SaiPa in the SM-liiga during the 2010-11 season.

References

External links

1984 births
Finnish ice hockey goaltenders
SaiPa players
Living people
People from Savonlinna
Sportspeople from South Savo